Events in the year 1981 in Brazil.

Incumbents

Federal government
 President: General João Figueiredo
 Vice President: Aureliano Chaves

Governors 
 Acre: vacant
 Alagoas: Guilherme Palmeira 
 Amazonas: José Bernardino Lindoso 
 Bahia: Antônio Carlos Magalhães 
 Ceará: Virgílio Távora 
 Espírito Santo: Eurico Vieira Resende 
 Goiás: Ary Valadão 
 Maranhão: João Castelo  
 Mato Grosso: Frederico Campos 
 Mato Grosso do Sul: Pedro Pedrossian 
 Minas Gerais: Francelino Pereira 
 Pará: Alacid Nunes 
 Paraíba: Tarcísio Burity  
 Paraná: Nei Braga 
 Pernambuco: Marco Maciel 
 Piauí: Lucídio Portela 
 Rio de Janeiro: Antônio Chagas Freitas
 Rio Grande do Norte: Lavoisier Maia 
 Rio Grande do Sul: José Augusto Amaral de Souza 
 Santa Catarina: Jorge Bornhausen	 
 São Paulo: Paulo Maluf 
 Sergipe: Augusto Franco

Vice governors
 Acre: José Fernandes Rego
 Alagoas: Teobaldo Vasconcelos Barbosa 
 Amazonas: Paulo Pinto Nery 
 Bahia: Luis Viana Neto 
 Ceará: Manuel de Castro Filho 
 Espírito Santo: José Carlos Fonseca 
 Goiás: Rui Brasil Cavalcanti 
 Maranhão: Artur Teixeira de Carvalho 
 Mato Grosso: José Vilanova Torres 
 Mato Grosso do Sul: vacant
 Minas Gerais: João Marques de Vasconcelos 
 Pará: Gerson dos Santos Peres 
 Paraíba: Clóvis Cavalcanti 
 Paraná: José Hosken de Novaes 
 Pernambuco: Roberto Magalhães Melo 
 Piauí: Waldemar de Castro Macedo
 Rio de Janeiro: Hamilton Xavier
 Rio Grande do Norte: Geraldo Melo 
 Rio Grande do Sul: Otávio Badui Germano 
 Santa Catarina: Henrique Hélion Velho de Córdova 
 São Paulo: José Maria Marin 
 Sergipe: Djenal Tavares Queiroz

Events 
January 6 – A passenger ship Novo Amapá sank by an overcrowded capacity off a rever mouth of Caja, Pará State, at least 130 persons were human fatalities, according to Transport Ministry of Brazil official confirmed report.
September 19 – According to  Transport Ministry of Brazil official confirmed report, a passenger ferry, Sobral Santos II capsized nearby Óbidos Port, Pará State, Amazon River, total more 300 persons were drown.

Births 
 March 1 Ana Hickmann,- model
 April 25 Felipe Massa, race car driver
 April 26 Mariana Ximenes, actress
 June 12 Adriana Lima, model
 June 24 Júnior Assunção, mixed martial artist
 June 25 Carlo Prater, mixed martial artist
 June 27 Cléber Santana, footballer (d. 2016)
 June 29 Maria Maya, actress
 July 5 Gianne Albertoni, model
 July 19 Anderson Luiz de Carvalho footballer
 July 26 – Maicon Douglas Sisenando, footballer
 November 4 — Adriana Araujo, boxer

Deaths

See also 
1981 in Brazilian football
1981 in Brazilian television
List of Brazilian films of 1981

References 

 
1980s in Brazil
Years of the 20th century in Brazil
Brazil
Brazil